Sebo Ebbens (born 31 October 1945) is a Dutch field hockey player. He competed in the men's tournament at the 1968 Summer Olympics.

References

External links
 

1945 births
Living people
Dutch male field hockey players
Olympic field hockey players of the Netherlands
Field hockey players at the 1968 Summer Olympics
Sportspeople from Groningen (city)
20th-century Dutch people